"Save Some Love" is the debut single by American singer-songwriter Keedy. Written by Greg Gerard, the single was released by Arista Records on May 13, 1991. It reached No. 15 on the Billboard Hot 100 chart. The song, included on Keedy's 1991 album, Chase the Clouds, represents her only hit song to date.

Track listing

Charts

Weekly charts

References

External links
 

1991 debut singles
1991 songs
American dance-pop songs
Arista Records singles
Keedy songs